ST8 may refer to:
ST8, the gene which encodes the protein for suppression of tumorigenicity 8 (ovarian)
ST8, a part of the United Kingdom's ST postcode area
ST8, an amateur radio call sign in Al'Fashir, Sudan
"St8", a song on the 2011 album Life in the Trenches
ST8 - General Insurance - Pricing Specialist Technical, an examination of the United Kingdom's Institute of Actuaries
ST8: Temple-City of Orcus, a roleplaying game sourcebook by Greg A. Vaughan

See also
Star Trek: First Contact, the eighth Star Trek film